The Colorado Supreme Court currently consists of a chief justice and six associate justices. From the court's formation until 1905, it had three members. Following is a list of justices of the Colorado Supreme Court.

References 
 Lewis, George E.; and Stackelbeck, D.F., eds., History of the Bench and Bar of Colorado, Bench & Bar Publishing Co., 1917. 
 List of Supreme Court Justices, Politicalgraveyard.com.
Justices of the Colorado Supreme Court, Colorado State Courts.
 Welcome to the Colorado Supreme Court and Court of Appeals-An Historical Guide, Colorado State Courts, 2010.

Colorado
Justices